Phyllis Haislip (born September 1, 1944) is an American author and historian. Her best-known work may be "Lottie's Courage," the story of a contraband slave growing up during the American Civil War.

Haislip’s work is informed by a Ph.D. from Columbia University in history and extensive, primary source research. She has taught history at universities such as The College of William and Mary and the University of Richmond. Her scholarly historical works range from the European Renaissance to the United States in World War II.  Her published works on World War I submarine warfare and naval commerce raiders have been especially popular. She writes both fiction and non-fiction and has won awards such as The Beacon of Freedom .

Books

External links

Phyllis Haislip’s Official Homepage and Weblog

1944 births
Living people
21st-century American novelists
American women novelists
21st-century American women writers